"Travelin' Man" is an American popular song, best known as a 1961 hit single sung by Ricky Nelson. Singer-songwriter Jerry Fuller wrote it with Sam Cooke in mind, but Cooke's manager was unimpressed and did not keep the demo, which eventually wound up being passed along to Nelson. His version reached No. 1 on the Billboard Hot 100. It was released as a double A-side with "Hello Mary Lou", which reached No. 9 on the same chart. In the United Kingdom, "Travelin' Man", coupled with "Hello Mary Lou", reached No. 2, becoming Nelson's biggest UK hit. Nelson is accompanied on the recording by the vocal quartet, The Jordanaires.

Plot
The song details the loves of a world traveler with an eye for beautiful women. Songwriter Fuller has described it as a "girl in every port" song. The women in each locale are referenced by a word or phrase associated with the location. The women were: a "pretty señorita" in Mexico, an Eskimo in Alaska, a fräulein in Berlin, a china doll in Hong Kong, and a Polynesian in Waikiki.  There were others as well, "in every port ... at least one," mentioned obliquely during the opening verse. The song was produced by Joe Johnson who was also famous for The Champs recording of "Tequila". Joe was the owner of 4 Star Records and Challenge Records.

Chart history

Weekly charts

Year-end charts

Covers
 Clover on Love on the Wire (1978).
A cover was released by Jacky Ward in 1982, reaching #32 on the US country chart.

Uses in popular culture
Neil Sedaka acknowledged using a portion of the melody and chord progression of "Travelin' Man" in his own song "Calendar Girl."

Nelson's version appears in a 2019 TV commercial for the Toyota Corolla hybrid.

In episode 5, season 4 of Stranger Things, Nelson's version is heard during Yuri's takeoff from the Yuri's Fish And Fly.

In episode 8, season 3 of King of the Hill, Hank sings this song while shaving in the bathroom, before being interrupted by Bobby.

See also
List of Hot 100 number-one singles of 1961 (U.S.)
The Wanderer (Dion song)

References

External links
 

1961 singles
Ricky Nelson songs
Jacky Ward songs
Billboard Hot 100 number-one singles
Cashbox number-one singles
Number-one singles in Australia
Number-one singles in New Zealand
Songs written by Jerry Fuller
1961 songs
Imperial Records singles
List songs